Kálmán Szabó was a Hungarian gymnast. He competed in the men's artistic individual all-around event at the 1908 Summer Olympics.

References

Year of birth missing
Year of death missing
Hungarian male artistic gymnasts
Olympic gymnasts of Hungary
Gymnasts at the 1906 Intercalated Games
Gymnasts at the 1908 Summer Olympics
Place of birth missing